KRLA (870 AM) "AM 870 The Answer" is a commercial radio station broadcasting a conservative talk radio format. Licensed to Glendale, California, it serves Greater Los Angeles and Southern California.  The station is owned by Salem Media Group, which also owns 99.5 KKLA-FM which features a Christian talk and teaching format, and 95.9 KFSH-FM with a contemporary Christian music format.
By day, KRLA transmits with 50,000 watts, the maximum for commercial AM stations. Since AM 870 is a clear channel frequency reserved for Class A WWL New Orleans, KRLA must reduce power at sunset to 3,000 watts to reduce interference. It uses a directional antenna with a three-tower array.  The transmitter is off El Reposo Drive in Los Angeles, near the Glendale Freeway.

On weekdays, KRLA airs a local wake up show, "The Morning Answer" with hosts Jennifer Horn and Grant Stinchfield.  The rest of the day, it carries nationally syndicated shows from the co-owned Salem Radio Network: Mike Gallagher, Dennis Prager, Hugh Hewitt, Charlie Kirk and Sebastian Gorka.  KRLA also carries Mark Levin, syndicated by Westwood One.  World and national news updates are provided by Townhall News.

History

KIEV 870 
In , the station signed on the air as KIEV.  It originally broadcast on 850 kilocycles. It moved to 870 kHz in 1941 as a result of the NARBA agreement.  For most of its early years, KIEV was a daytimer, required to go off the air at sunset.  

The station had various formats, including Top 40, Country music, Big bands and adult standards.   Programs included Tomorrow's Heroes with Andrea Speyer, Talk Back with George Putnam, The Swingin' Years with host Chuck Cecil, Grace to You with John MacArthur, horse racing from Santa Anita Park and Hollywood Park Racetrack, and University of Nebraska football.

Salem Communications bought KIEV in 1998 for $33.4 million.

KRLA talk (2001–present) 
 On January 1, 2001, 870 AM adopted the KRLA call letters.  KRDC 1110 AM, had used those call letters for several decades, beginning in 1959, broadcasting an oldies format.

Weekends on KRLA feature shows on law, pet care and financial advice, as well as brokered programming. On June 14, 2010, KRLA added Glenn Beck's radio show to the weekday lineup, but the show was discontinued several years later.  The KRLA-produced Terry Anderson Show aired on Sundays at 9 p.m., until Anderson died on July 7, 2010.

In 2014, rival talk radio station KABC, owned by Cumulus Media, discontinued the Mark Levin and Larry Elder shows. In 2015 Salem Communications added both hosts to its line-up. By June 2015 KRLA's Los Angeles ratings pulled ahead of rival KABC. Salem Communications owns two other Talk Radio stations in Southern California, 590 KTIE, serving the Inland Empire (Riverside County and San Bernardino County) and 1170 KCBQ serving San Diego.

References

External links 
FCC History Cards for KRLA

 KRLA section of the Broadcast History Archive
 Pictorial Tour of KRLA 1110AM
 L.A. Radio Station Listings
 The "KRLA Beat" website, one of America's earliest rock-n-roll newspapers

Glendale, California
Radio stations established in 1942
RLA
News and talk radio stations in the United States
Conservative talk radio
Salem Media Group properties